This is a list of earthquakes in 1905. Only magnitude 6.0 or greater earthquakes appear on the list. Exceptions to this are earthquakes which have caused death, injury or damage. Events which occurred in remote areas will be excluded from the list as they wouldn't have generated significant media interest. All dates are listed according to UTC time. Several events during the year provided some interest. The most notable was a devastating quake which struck India in April. With 19,000 deaths this was the deadliest quake in the infancy of the 20th century. Mongolia was shaken during July by a pair of great magnitude 8.3 events which caused no deaths.

Overall

By death toll 

 Note: At least 10 casualties

By magnitude 

 Note: At least 7.0 magnitude

Notable events

January

February

March

April

May

June

July

August

September

October

November

December

References 

1905

1905